Andropogon virginicus is a species of grass known by several common names, including broomsedge bluestem, yellowsedge bluestem and (in Australia, because it was introduced to that country after being used as packaging for bottles of American whiskey) whiskey grass. It is native to the southeastern United States and as far north as the Great Lakes. It is known as an introduced species in California and Hawaii, where it is weedy.

Invasive species 
Andropogon virginicus has also been introduced to Japan and Australia. It competes with other species by allelopathy, releasing persistent herbicidal chemicals from its dying tissues, such as decaying leaves. A. virginicus colonizes disturbed areas such as abandoned mining sites. It is a weed of pastures and grazing ranges, where it proves less palatable and nutritious to cattle than other grasses. This species is tolerant of fire and grows back quickly and more abundantly after a burn. It is perhaps most problematic in Hawaii, where its natural growth patterns are out of synch with the local climate. It is dormant during the Hawaiian rainy season, dying back and leaving the slopes it has colonized exposed and vulnerable to significant erosion. Despite its weediness, the grass is sometimes grown as an ornamental plant.

The species is now considered invasive in New Caledonia and is stated in legal texts.

The species features on the list of Invasive Alien Species of Union Concern. This means that import of the species and trade in the species is forbidden in the whole of the European Union.

Life history 
Andropogon virginicus is a perennial grass forming narrow clumps of stems up to just over a meter in maximum height [approx. 3 feet 3 inches]. Its stems and leaves are green when new, turning purplish to orange and then straw-colored with age. It produces large amounts of seeds small enough to disperse on the wind. This grass is successful in a wide range of habitats. It is a prolific seed producer, it has a high germination rate and seedling survival rate, and it thrives in poor soils.

Uses 
Andropogon virginicus has been used as the straw base for the production of handmade brooms in the southeastern United States.

References

External links 
 
 Grass Manual Treatment
 VT Weed Guide
 

virginicus
Warm-season grasses of North America
Grasses of the United States
Grasses of Canada
Flora of Eastern Canada
Flora of the Southeastern United States
Flora of the Eastern United States
Flora of the Great Lakes region (North America)
Plants described in 1753
Taxa named by Carl Linnaeus